Volkan Gucer is a music composer, producer, performer on the dilli kaval (Turkish wooden flute), and the Irish whistle.

With a professional career that spans more than 14 years, he has written and produced music for 40 TV series and films, as well as numerous documentaries and commercial jingles. He is best known for the songs "Amerikali", "Gölge Çiçegi", and "Gözlerinde Son Gece" that he composed for the movies with the same titles (lyrics by Aysel Gürel). His library CD's, A Kanun Journey Through Turkiye and Vocal Manoeuvers, catalogue many of his most exceptional works and have been distributed throughout Europe and Asia.

Gucer is a founding member of the Composers, Authors, and Publishers Rights Organisation of Turkey, MSG.

Along with his interest in wooden flutes, Gucer produced Dreamin' Istanbul of "Burak Demir", "Hancer" & Paslanmaz of "Burak Aziz" and "Koku" of Beyza Durmaz.

Gucer had guest appearances in the concerts of the Italian Milagro Acustico Ensemble in Rome and Istanbul.

Along with being the producer of the album, Gucer also performed in the concert of Burak Demir's Dreamin' Istanbul Project.

References

External links

Living people
Turkish composers
Galatasaray High School alumni
Boğaziçi University alumni
1964 births